Hemåt is a 1969 studio album by the Swedish psychedelic rock band Harvester.

Hemåt is the band's first and only release under the name "Harvester." A year after the release of Sov gott Rose-Marie the band shortened its name from "International Harvester" to "Harvester". The album is composed by musicians Bo Anders Persson, Thomas Tidholm,  Urban Yman, Kjell Westling, Arne Eriksson, Torbjörn Abelli, Thomas Gartz and  Ulla.
Hemåt continued its predecessor's move towards a nationalist music that was both politically and environmentally charged. The album was recorded in "Kafe Marx", a small cafe owned by the youth league of the Swedish Communist Party.

Track listing
"När Lingonen Mognar" (When the Lingonberries are Ripen) - 3:24
"Kristallen Den Fina" (Beautiful Crystal) - 6:28
"Kuk-Polska" (Cock-Polska) - 2:46
"Nepal Boogie" - 8:13
"Everybody Needs Somebody to Love" - 7:22
"Bacon Tomorrow" - 6:33
"Och Solen Går Upp" (And the Sun Rises) - 6:33
"Hemåt" (Homeward) - 7:47

Sources

Haglund, Marcus "The History of Parson Sound - International Harvester and Harvester" found in the cd booklets of International Harvester: Sov gott Rose-Marie and Harvester: Hemat.

1969 albums
Experimental music albums
Träd, Gräs & Stenar albums
Swedish-language albums